A metal ion in aqueous solution or aqua ion is a cation, dissolved in water, of chemical formula [M(H2O)n]z+. The solvation number, n, determined by a variety of experimental methods is 4 for Li+ and Be2+ and 6 for most elements in periods 3 and 4 of the periodic table. Lanthanide and actinide aqua ions have higher solvation numbers (often 8 to 9), with the highest known being 11 for Ac3+. The strength of the bonds between the metal ion and water molecules in the primary solvation shell increases with the electrical charge, z, on the metal ion and decreases as its ionic radius, r, increases. Aqua ions are subject to hydrolysis. The logarithm of the first hydrolysis constant is proportional to z2/r for most aqua ions.

The aqua ion is associated, through hydrogen bonding with other water molecules in a secondary solvation shell. Water molecules in the first hydration shell exchange with molecules in the second solvation shell and molecules in the bulk liquid. The residence time of a molecule in the first shell varies among the chemical elements from about 100 picoseconds to more than 200 years. Aqua ions are prominent in electrochemistry.

Introduction to metal aqua ions 
{| class=wikitable style=text-align:center
|+Elements that form aqua ions
|-
| H || colspan=30 |
|
|-
| Li|| Be ||colspan=24|
|| || || || || ||
|-
| Na|| Mg  ||colspan=24| 
|  Al
|| || || || ||
|-
| K|| Ca|| colspan=14|
|Sc||Ti||V||Cr||Mn||Fe||Co||Ni||Cu
|Zn||Ga ||Ge*|| || || ||
|-
| Rb|| Sr|| colspan=14|
||Y||Zr||||Mo||||Ru||Rh||Pd||Ag
|Cd||In||Sn||Sb* 
|| || ||
|-
|Cs|| Ba|| La
|Ce||Pr||Nd|| Pm ||Sm||Eu||Gd||Tb||Dy||Ho||Er||Tm||Yb||Lu 
|Hf||||||||||Ir||Pt||Au
|Hg||Tl||Pb||Bi||Po*||

||
|-
|Fr*||Ra*||Ac
| Th||Pa||U||Np||Pu
|Am||Cm||Bk
|Cf||Es*||Fm*||Md*||No*||Lr*||||||||||||||||||||||||||||||
|}
* No experimental information regarding aqua ion structures
Most chemical elements are metallic. Compounds of the metallic elements usually form simple aqua ions with the formula [M(H2O)n]z+ in low oxidation states. With the higher oxidation states the simple aqua ions dissociate losing hydrogen ions to yield complexes that contain both water molecules and hydroxide or oxide ions, such as the vanadium(IV) species [VO(H2O)5]2+. In the highest oxidation states only oxyanions, such as the permanganate(VII) ion, are known. A few metallic elements that are commonly found only in high oxidation states, such as niobium and tantalum, are not known to form aqua cations; near the metal–nonmetal boundary, arsenic and tellurium are only known as hydrolysed species. Some elements, such as tin and antimony, are clearly metals, but form only covalent compounds in the highest oxidation states: their aqua cations are restricted to their lower oxidation states. Germanium is a semiconductor rather than a metal, but appears to form an aqua cation; similarly, hydrogen forms an aqua cation like metals, despite being a gas. The transactinides have been greyed out due to a lack of experimental data; a similar problem affects astatine, which forms a cationic species, but whether it is an aqua cation is unknown and the little evidence suggests that it might not be one. For some highly radioactive elements, experimental chemistry has been done, and periodicity suggests that aqua ions were formed; but no experimental information is available regarding the structure of those putative aqua ions.

In aqueous solution the water molecules directly attached to the metal ion are said to belong to the first coordination sphere, also known as the first, or primary, solvation shell. The bond between a water molecule and the metal ion is a dative covalent bond, with the oxygen atom donating both electrons to the bond. Each coordinated water molecule may be attached by hydrogen bonds to other water molecules. The latter are said to reside in the second coordination sphere. The second coordination sphere is not a well defined entity for ions with charge 1 or 2. In dilute solutions it merges into the water structure in which there is an irregular network of hydrogen bonds between water molecules. With tripositive ions the high charge on the cation polarizes the water molecules in the first solvation shell to such an extent that they form strong enough hydrogen bonds with molecules in the second shell to form a more stable entity.

The strength of the metal-oxygen bond can be estimated in various ways. The hydration enthalpy, though based indirectly on experimental measurements, is the most reliable measure. The scale of values is based on an arbitrarily chosen zero, but this does not affect differences between the values for two metals. Other measures include the M–O vibration frequency and the M–O bond length. The strength of the M-O bond tends to increase with the charge and decrease as the size of the metal ion increases. In fact there is a very good linear correlation between hydration enthalpy and the ratio of charge squared to ionic radius, z2/r. For ions in solution Shannon's "effective ionic radius" is the measure most often used.

Water molecules in the first and second solvation shells can exchange places. The rate of exchange varies enormously, depending on the metal and its oxidation state. Metal aqua ions are always accompanied in solution by solvated anions, but much less is known about anion solvation than about cation solvation.

Understanding of the nature of aqua ions is helped by having information on the nature of solvated cations in mixed solvents and non-aqueous solvents, such as liquid ammonia, methanol, dimethyl formamide and dimethyl sulfoxide to mention a few.

Occurrence in nature 
Aqua ions are present in most natural waters. Na+, K+, Mg2+ and Ca2+ are major constituents of seawater.
{| class="wikitable" style=text-align:center
|+ Aqua ions in seawater (salinity = 35)                                          
|-
! Ion  
| 
|  
| 
| 
|-
!Concentration (mol kg−1)
| 0.469 
| 0.0102 
| 0.0528 
| 0.0103
|}

Many other aqua ions are present in seawater in concentrations ranging from ppm to ppt. The concentrations of sodium, potassium, magnesium and calcium in blood are similar to those of seawater. Blood also has lower concentrations of essential elements such as iron and zinc. Sports drink is designed to be isotonic and also contains the minerals which are lost in perspiration.

Magnesium and calcium ions are common constituents of domestic water and are responsible for permanent and temporary hardness, respectively. They are often found in mineral water.

Experimental methods 
Information obtained on the nature of ions in solution varies with the nature of the experimental method used. Some methods reveal properties of the cation directly, others reveal properties that depend on both cation and anion. Some methods supply information of a static nature, a kind of snapshot of average properties, others give information about the dynamics of the solution.

Nuclear magnetic resonance (NMR) 
Ions for which the water-exchange rate is slow on the NMR time-scale give separate peaks for molecules in the first solvation shell and for other water molecules. The solvation number is obtained as a ratio of peak areas. Here it refers to the number of water molecules in the first solvation shell. Molecules in the second solvation shell exchange rapidly with solvent molecules, giving rise to a small change in the chemical shift value of un-coordinated water molecules from that of water itself. The main disadvantage of this method is that it requires fairly concentrated solutions, with the associated risk of ion-pair formation with the anion.

X-ray diffraction (XRD)

A solution containing an aqua ion does not have the long-range order that would be present in a crystal containing the same ion, but there is short-range order. X-ray diffraction on solutions yields a radial distribution function from which the coordination number of the metal ion and metal-oxygen distance may be derived. With aqua ions of high charge some information is obtained about the second solvation shell.

This technique requires the use of relatively concentrated solutions. X-rays are scatted by electrons, so scattering power increases with atomic number. This makes hydrogen atoms all but invisible to X-ray scattering.

Large angle X-ray scattering has been used to characterize the second solvation shell with trivalent ions such as Cr3+ and Rh3+. This implies that every molecule in the first hydration shell is hydrogen bonded to two molecules in the second shell.

Neutron diffraction 
Diffraction by neutrons also give a radial distribution function. In contrast to X-ray diffraction, neutrons are scatted by nuclei and there is no relationship with atomic number. Indeed, use can be made of the fact that different isotopes of the same element can have widely different scattering powers. In a classic experiment, measurements were made on four nickel chloride solutions using the combinations of 58Ni, 60Ni, 35Cl and 37Cl isotopes to yield a very detailed picture of cation and anion solvation. Data for a number of metal salts show some dependence on the salt concentration.

 †Figures in brackets are standard deviations on the last significant figure of the value.‡ angle between a M-OH2 bond and the plane of the water molecule.
Most of these data refer to concentrated solutions in which there are very few water molecules that are not in the primary hydration spheres of the cation or anion, which may account for some of the variation of solvation number with concentration even if there is no contact ion pairing. The angle θ gives the angle of tilt of the water molecules relative to a plane in the aqua ion. This angle is affected by the hydrogen bonds formed between water molecules in the primary and secondary solvation shells.

The measured solvation number is a time-averaged value for the solution as a whole. When a measured primary solvation number is fractional there are two or more species with integral solvation numbers present in equilibrium with each other. This also applies to solvation numbers that are integral numbers, within experimental error. For example, the solvation number of 5.5 for a lithium chloride solution could be interpreted as being due to presence of two different aqua ions with equal concentrations.
 [Li(H2O)6]+  [Li(H2O)5]+ + H2O
Another possibility is that there is interaction between a solvated cation and an anion, forming an ion pair. This is particularly relevant when measurements are made on concentrated salt solutions. For example, a solvation number of 3 for a lithium chloride solution could be interpreted as being due to the equilibrium
 [Li(H2O)4]+ + Cl−  [Li(H2O)3Cl] + H2O
lying wholly in favour of the ion pair.

Vibrational spectra 
Infrared spectra and Raman spectra can be used to measure the M-O stretching frequency in metal aqua ions. Raman spectroscopy is particularly useful because the Raman spectrum of water is weak whereas the infrared spectrum of water is intense. Interpretation of the vibration frequencies is somewhat complicated by the presence, in octahedral and tetrahedral ions, of two vibrations, a symmetric one measured in the Raman spectrum and an anti-symmetric one, measured in the infrared spectrum.

Although the relationship between vibration frequency and force constant is not simple, the general conclusion that can be taken from these data is that the strength of the M-O bond increases with increasing ionic charge and decreasing ionic size. The M-O stretching frequency of an aqua ion in solution may be compared with its counterpart in a crystal of known structure. If the frequencies are very similar it can be concluded that the coordination number of the metal ion is the same in solution as it is in a compound in the solid state.

Dynamic methods
Data such as conductivity, electrical mobility and diffusion relate to the movement of ions through a solution. When an ion moves through a solution it tends to take both first and second solvation shells with it. Hence solvation numbers measured from dynamic properties tend to be much higher that those obtained from static properties.
{| class="wikitable"
|+Hydration numbers measured by dynamic methods
|-
! !! Li+!! Na+!!Cs+!!Mg2+!!Ca2+!!Ba2+!!Zn2+!!Cr3+||Al3+
|-
| Ion transport number||13-22||7-13||4||12-14||8-12||3-5||10-13|| ||
|-
| Ion mobility||3-21||2-10|| ||10-13||7-11||5-9||10-13|| ||
|-
| Diffusion||5||3||1||9||9||8||11||17||13
|}

Solvation numbers and structures

Hydrogen 

Hydrogen is not a metal, but like them it tends to lose its valence electron in chemical reactions, forming a cation H+. In aqueous solution, this immediately attaches itself to a water molecule, forming a species generally symbolised as H3O+ (sometimes loosely written H+). Such hydration forms cations that can in essence be considered as [H(OH2)n]+.

The solvation of H+ in water is not fully characterised and many different structures have been suggested. Two well-known structures are the Zundel cation and the Eigen cation. The Eigen solvation structure has the hydronium ion at the center of an  complex in which the hydronium is strongly hydrogen-bonded to three neighbouring water molecules. In the Zundel  complex the proton is shared equally by two water molecules in a symmetric hydrogen bond.

Alkali metals 

The hydrated lithium cation in water is probably tetrahedral and four-coordinated. There are most probably six water molecules in the primary solvation sphere of the octahedral sodium ion. Potassium is seven-coordinate, and rubidium and caesium are probably eight-coordinate square antiprismatic. No data is available for francium.

Alkaline earth metals 

Other values include Zn2+ -2044.3, Cd2+ -1805.8 and Ag+ -475.3 kJ mol−1.

There is an excellent linear correlation between hydration enthalpy and the ratio of charge squared, z2, to M-O distance, reff.

Values for transition metals are affected by crystal field stabilization. The general trend is shown by the magenta line which passes through Ca2+, Mn2+ and Zn2+, for which there is no stabilization in an octahedral crystal field. Hydration energy increases as size decreases. Crystal field splitting confers extra stability on the aqua ion. The maximum crystal field stabilization energy occurs at Ni2+. The agreement of the hydration enthalpies with predictions provided one basis for the general acceptance of crystal field theory.

The hydration enthalpies of the trivalent lanthanide ions show an increasingly negative values at atomic number increases, in line with the decrease in ionic radius known as the lanthanide contraction.

Single ion hydration entropy can be derived. Values are shown in the following table. The more negative the value, the more there is ordering in forming the aqua ion. It is notable that the heavy alkali metals have rather small entropy values which suggests that both the first and second solvation shells are somewhat indistinct.

{| class="wikitable" style=text-align:center
|+Single ion standard hydration entropy at 25 °C /J deg−1 mol−1
| Li+-118.8||
|-
|Na+-87.4||Mg2+-267.8|| || ||Al3+-464.4
|-
|K+-51.9||Ca2+-209.2|| || ...||Ga3+-510.4
|-
|Rb+-40.2||Sr2+-205.0|| ||... ||In3+-426.8
|-
|Cs+-36.8||Ba2+-159.0
||La3+-368.2||... ||
|}

Hydrolysis of aqua ions

There are two ways of looking at an equilibrium involving hydrolysis of an aqua ion. Considering the dissociation equilibrium
[M(H2O)n]z+ - H+ [M(H2O)n-1(OH)](z-1)+
the activity of the hydrolysis product, omitting the water molecules, is given by

The alternative is to write the equilibrium as a complexation or substitution reaction
[M(H2O)n]z+ +OH−  :[M(H2O)n-1(OH)](z-1)+ + H2O
In which case

The concentration of hydrogen and hydroxide ions are related by the self-ionization of water, Kw = {H+} {OH−} so the two equilibrium constants are related as

In practice the first definition is more useful because equilibrium constants are determined from measurements of hydrogen ion concentrations. In general,

charges are omitted for the sake of generality and activities have been replaced by concentrations.  are cumulative hydrolysis constants.

Modeling the hydrolysis reactions that occur in solution is usually based on the determination of equilibrium constants from potentiometric (pH) titration data. The process is far from straightforward for a variety of reasons. Sometimes the species in solution can be precipitated as salts and their structure confirmed by X-ray crystallography. In other cases, precipitated salts bear no relation to what is postulated to be in solution, because a particular crystalline substances may have both low solubility and very low concentration in the solutions.

First hydrolysis constant 

The logarithm of hydrolysis constant, K1,-1, for the removal of one proton from an aqua ion
[M(H2O)n]z+ - H+  [M(H2O)n-1(OH)](z-1)+
[ [M(OH)]{(z-1)+ ] = K1,-1 [Mz+] [H+] −1
shows a linear relationship with the ratio of charge to M-O distance, z/d. Ions fall into four groups. The slope of the straight line is the same for all groups, but the intercept, A, is different.
{| class="wikitable"
|+log K1,-1 = A + 11.0 z/d
!cation||A
|-
|Mg2+, Ca2+, Sr2+, Ba2+  Al3+, Y3+, La3+||
|-
| Li+, Na+, K+Be2+, Mn2+, Fe2+, Co2+, Ni2+, Cu2+, Zn2+, Cd2+Sc3+, Ti3+, V3+, Cr3+, Fe3+, Rh3+, Ga3+, In3+ Ce4+, Th4+, Pa4+, U4+, Np4+, Pu4+,   ||
|-
| Ag+, Tl+ Pb2+ Ti3+, Bi3+,   ||
|-
| Sn2+, Hg2+, Sn2+, Pd2+ ||ca. 12
|}
The cations most resistant to hydrolysis for their size and charge are hard pre-transition metal ions or lanthanide ions. The slightly less resistant group includes the transition metal ions. The third group contains mostly soft ions ion of post-transition metals. The ions which show the strongest tendency to hydrolyze for their charge and size are Pd2+, Sn2+ and  Hg2+.

The standard enthalpy change for the first hydrolysis step is generally not very different from that of the dissociation of pure water. Consequently, the standard enthalpy change for the substitution reaction
[M(H2O)n]z+ +OH−  :[M(H2O)n-1(OH)](z-1)+ + H2O
is close to zero. This is typical of reactions between a hard cation and a hard anion, such as the hydroxide ion. It means that the standard entropy charge is the major contributor to the standard free energy change and hence the equilibrium constant.

The change in ionic charge  is responsible for the effect as the aqua ion has a greater ordering effect on the solution than the less highly charged hydroxo complex.

Multiple hydrolysis reactions 

The hydrolysis of beryllium shows many of the characteristics typical of multiple hydrolysis reactions. The concentrations of various species, including polynuclear species with bridging hydroxide ions, change as a function of pH up to the precipitation of an insoluble hydroxide. Beryllium hydrolysis is unusual in that the concentration of [Be(H2O)3(OH)]+ is too low to be measured. Instead a trimer ([Be3(H2O)6(OH3))3+ is formed, whose structure has been confirmed in solid salts. The formation of polynuclear species is driven by the reduction in charge density within the molecule as a whole. The local environment of the beryllium ions approximates to [Be(H2O)2(OH)2]+. The reduction in effective charge releases free energy in the form of a decrease of the entropy of ordering at the charge centers.
{| class="wikitable"
|+Some polynuclear hydrolysis products
! Species formula!! cations!! ! scope="col" width="300" |structure
|-
| M2(OH)+|| Be2+, Mn2+, Co2+, Ni2+  Zn2+, Cd2+, Hg2+, Pb2+ ||single hydroxide bridge between two cations
|-
|M2(OH) ||Cu2+, Sn2+  Al3+, Sc3+, Ln3+, Ti3+, Cr3+  Th4+ VO2+,  || double hydroxide bridge between two cations
|-
|  ||Be2+, Hg2+ || six-membered ring with alternate Mn+ and OH− groups
|-
|(OH) ||Sn2+, Pb2+  Al3+, Cr3+, Fe3+, In3+ || Cube with alternate vertices of Mn+ and OH− groups, one vertex missing
|-
| ||Mg2+, Co2+, Ni2+, Cd2+, Pb2+ ||Cube with alternate vertices of Mn+ and OH− groups
|-
| || Zr4+, Th4+ || Square of Mn+ ions with double hydroxide bridges on each side of the square
|}
The hydrolysis product of aluminium formulated as [Al13O4(OH)24(H2O)12]7+ is very well characterized and may be present in nature in water at pH ca. 5.4.

The overall reaction for the loss of two protons from an aqua ion can be written as
[M(H2O)n]z+ - 2 H+ [M(H2O)n-2(OH)2](z-2)+
However, the equilibrium constant for the loss of two protons applies equally well to the equilibrium
[M(H2O)n]z+ - 2 H+ [MO(H2O)n-2](z-2)+ + H2O
because the concentration of water is assumed to be constant. This applies in general: any equilibrium constant is equally valid for a product with an oxide ion as for the product with two hydroxyl ions. The two possibilities can only be distinguished by determining the structure of a salt in the solid state. Oxo bridges tend to occur when the metal oxidation state is high. An example is provided by the molybdenum(IV) complex [Mo3O4(H2O)9]4+ in which there is a triangle of molybdenum atoms joined by σ- bonds with an oxide bridge on each edge of the triangle and a fourth oxide which bridges to all three Mo atoms.

Oxyanions 

There are very few oxo-aqua ions of metals in the oxidation state +5 or higher. Rather, the species found in aqueous solution are monomeric and polymeric oxyanions. Oxyanions can be viewed as the end products of hydrolysis, in which there are no water molecules attached to the metal, only oxide ions.

Exchange kinetics 
A water molecule in the first solvation shell of an aqua ion may exchange places with a water molecule in the bulk solvent.  It is usually assumed that the rate-determining step is a dissociation reaction.
[M(H2O)n]z+ → [M(H2O)n-1]z+* + H2O
The * symbol signifies that this is the transition state in a chemical reaction. The rate of this reaction is proportional to the concentration of the aqua ion, [A].
 .
The proportionality constant, k, is called a first-order rate constant at temperature T. The unit of the reaction rate for water exchange is usually taken as mol dm−3s−1.

The half-life for this reaction is equal to loge2 / k. This quantity with the dimension of time is useful because it is independent of concentration. The quantity 1/k, also with dimension of time, equal to the half life divided by 0.6932, is known as the residence time or time constant.

The residence time for water exchange varies from about 10−10 s for Cs+ to about 10+10 s (more than 200 y) for Ir3+. It depends on factors such as the size and charge on the ion and, in the case of transition metal ions, crystal field effects. Very fast and very slow reactions are difficult to study. The most information on the kinetics a water exchange comes from systems with a residence time between about 1 μs and 1 s. The enthalpy and entropy of activation, ΔH‡ and  ΔS‡ can be obtained by observing the variation of rate constant with temperature.

{| class="wikitable" style="text-align:center"
|+ Kinetic parameters (at 25 °C) for water exchange: divalent ions, M2+ (aq)  
|-
! !!Be||Mg||V||Cr!!Mn!!Fe!!Co	!!Ni!!Cu!!Zn||UO2
|-
!Residence time  (μs)
|	0.001	||2	||0.00013	||0.0032	||0.0316	||0.32	 ||0.79	||40	||0.0005	||0.032||1.3 
|-
!ΔH‡ (kJ mol−1)
| ||		43	||69	||13	||34	||32	||33	||43	||23 || ||		
|-
!ΔS‡ (J deg−1mol−1)
| ||		8	||21	||-13	||12	||-13	||-17	||-22	||25 || ||
|}
Note the general increase in the residence time from vanadium to nickel, which mirrors the decrease in ion size with increasing atomic number, which is a general trend in the periodic table, though given a specific name only in the case of the lanthanide contraction. The effects of crystal field stabilization energy are superimposed on the periodic trend.

{| class="wikitable" style="text-align:center"
|+ Kinetic parameters (at 25 °C) for water exchange - trivalent ions, M3+ (aq)
|-
! ||	Al||	Ti||	Cr||	Fe||	Ga||	Rh||	In||	La
|-
!  residence	time (μs)
| 6.3×106	||16	||2.0×1012	||316	||501	||3.2×1013	||50	||0.050		
|-
!ΔH‡	(kJ mol−1)
|		11	||26	||109	||37	||26	||134	||17 ||			
|-
!ΔS‡	(J deg−1mol−1)
|		117	||-63	||0	||-54	||-92	||59 || ||	
|}
Solvent exchange is generally slower for trivalent than for divalent ions, as the higher electrical charge on the cation makes for stronger M-OH2 bonds and, in consequence, higher activation energy for the dissociative reaction step, [M(H2O)n]3+ → [M(H2O)n-1]3+ + H2O. The values in the table show that this is due to both activation enthalpy and entropy factors.

The ion [Al(H2O)6]3+ is relatively inert to substitution reactions because its electrons are effectively in a closed shell electronic configuration, [Ne]3s23p6, making dissociation an energy-expensive reaction. Cr3+, which has an octahedral structure and a d3 electronic configuration is also relatively inert, as are Rh3+ and Ir3+ which have a low-spin d6 configuration.

Formation of complexes 

Metal aqua ions are often involved in the formation of complexes. The reaction may be written as
pMx+(aq)  + qLy− → [MpLq](px-qy)+
In reality this is a substitution reaction in which one or more water molecules from the first hydration shell of the metal ion are replaced by ligands, L. The complex is described as an inner-sphere complex. A complex such as [ML](p-q)+ may be described as a contact ion pair.

When the water molecule(s) of the second hydration shell are replaced by ligands, the complex is said to be an outer-sphere complex, or solvent-shared ion pair. The formation of solvent-shared or contact ion pairs is particularly relevant to the determination of solvation numbers of aqua ions by methods that require the use of concentrated solutions of salts, as ion pairing is concentration-dependent. Consider, for example, the formation of the complex [MgCl]+ in solutions of MgCl2. The formation constant K of the complex is about 1 but varies with ionic strength. The concentration of the rather weak complex increases from about 0.1% for a 10mM solution to about 70% for a 1M solution (1M = 1 mol dm−3).

Electrochemistry
The standard electrode potential for the half-cell equilibrium Mz+ + z   M(s) has been measured for all metals except for the heaviest trans-uranium elements.

{| class=wikitable style=text-align:center
|+Standard electrode potentials /V for couples Mz+/M(s)
|-
| H0
|-
| Li−3.040|| Be2+ −1.85
|-
| Na −2.71|| Mg2+ −2.372|| || || || Al3+−1.66
|-
| K  −2.931|| Ca2+ −2.868|| Sc3+−2.90
|...||Zn2+  −0.751||Ga3+  −0.53||Ge2+ +0.1
|-
| Rb  −2.98|| Sr2+ −2.899|| Y3+−2.37
|...||Cd2+  −0.403||In3+  −0.342||Sn2+  −0.136||Sb3+ +0.15
|-
|Cs −3.026|| Ba2+ −2.912||Lu3+  −2.25
|...||Hg2+  −0.854||Tl3+  +0.73||Pb2+  −0.126||Bi3+  +0.16||Po4+ +0.76
|-
| Fr−2.9 || Ra2+−2.8||Lr3+ −1.96
|-
|
|-
| || ||La3+−2.52  ||Ce3+  −2.32 ||Pr3+  −2.34||Nd3+  −2.32|| Pm3+−2.30 ||Sm3+  −2.28
|Eu3+  −1.98||Gd3+  −2.27||Tb3+  −2.27
|Dy3+  −2.32||Ho3+  −2.37||Er3+  −2.33
|Tm3+  −2.30||Yb3+  −2.23
|-
| || || Ac3+  −2.18||Th4+  −1.83||Pa4+  −1.46||U4+  −1.51||Np4+  −1.33||Pu4+  −1.80
|Am3+  −2.06||Cm3+  −2.07||Bk3+  −2.03
|Cf3+  −2.01||Es3+  −1.99||Fm3+  −1.97||Md3+  −1.65||No3+  −1.20
|}
{| class=wikitable style=text-align:center
|+Standard electrode potentials /V for 1st. row transition metal ions
!Couple!!Ti!!V!!Cr!!Mn!!Fe!!Co!!Ni!!Cu
|-
|M2+ / M||−1.63||−1.18||−0.91||−1.18||−0.473||−0.28||−0.228||+0.345
|-
|M3+ / M||−1.37||−0.87||−0.74||−0.28||−0.06||+0.41
|}
{| class=wikitable style=text-align:center
|+Miscellaneous standard electrode potentials /V
!Ag+ / Ag!!Pd2+ / Pd!!Pt2+ / Pt!!Zr4+ / Zr!!Hf4+ / Hf!!Au3+ / Au!!Ce4+ / Ce
|-
| +0.799||+0.915||+1.18||−1.53||−1.70|| +1.50||−1.32
|}

As the standard electrode potential is more negative the aqua ion is more difficult to reduce. For example, comparing the potentials for zinc (-0.75 V) with those of iron (Fe(II) -0.47 V, Fe(III) -0.06 V) it is seen that iron ions are more easily reduced than zinc ions. This is the basis for using zinc to provide anodic protection for large structures made of iron or to protect small structures by galvanization.

References

Bibliography

Further reading 
 H. L. Friedman, F. Franks, Aqueous Solutions of Simple Electrolytes, Springer; reprint of the 1973 edition, 2012 

Solutions